Intersil is an American semiconductor company headquartered in Milpitas, California. As of February 24, 2017, Intersil is a subsidiary of Renesas. The previous Intersil was formed in August 1999 through the acquisition  of the semiconductor business of Harris Corporation. Intersil is a power management IC business, with specialized capability in power management and precision analog technology for applications in industrial, infrastructure, mobile, automotive and aerospace.

Company history

The original Intersil, Inc. was founded in 1967 by the Swiss physicist Jean Hoerni to develop digital watch Integrated Circuits (ICs). The European subsidiary Eurosil was originally partially funded by SSIH, a Swiss watch company. Later-on, Intersil had a development contract with the Japanese company Daini Seikosha and became supplier of low-voltage CMOS watch ICs for Seiko. When microprocessors emerged to the market in the 1970s, Intersil participated with its 12-bit IM6100, which was the first microprocessor produced in CMOS technology and emulated the PDP-8 instruction set.

In 1988, Intersil was taken over by Harris Semiconductor, which had offered the IM6100 as second source. Harris combined these activities with the semiconductor divisions of Radiation Incorporated, General Electric and RCA they had taken over before. In 1999 Harris spun off its entire semiconductor division and Intersil Corporation was created  with the largest IPO in American semiconductor industry history. The second Intersil Corporation is a different company from the original Intersil, Inc.

Next to digital circuits like microprocessors and memories like the 1k-bit CMOS RAM IM6508 and CMOS EPROMS IM6604/IM6654 Intersil designed famous analogue ICs like the ICL8038 waveform generator. A creation of Intersil (as Harris Semiconductor) is the PRISM line of Wi-Fi hardware: that group of products was sold to GlobespanVirata in 2003, and maintained by Conexant. Intersil is the manufacturer of the RCA (CDP)1802 microprocessor (also known as RCA COSMAC), a CPU traditionally used in space applications.

In the 2000s, Intersil established market leadership in Vcore power management for PCs, switching and buck boost regulators for industrial and consumer power systems, and radiation hardened analog and power ICs for military and commercial applications.

The company, under CEO Dave Bell, then began the expansion of a catalog analog business. The company also completed a series of acquisitions, two of which are still part of the portfolio, Zilker Labs digital power devices and Techwell automotive and security and surveillance products.

In 2012, with revenue in decline, the company's board of directors removed Dave Bell and began a search for a new CEO.  In March 2013, the board appointed Necip Sayiner, the architect of Silicon Labs' turnaround, as CEO.  Sayiner concentrated the company's efforts on power management and select target markets.  The company was able to return to profitability in 2013 and in early 2014 re-launched  as a power management company, with products to improve power efficiency, extend battery life and reduce size.

Japanese semiconductor company Renesas acquired Intersil on February 24, 2017.

Products
Intersil develops and markets power management and analog technology for applications in the industrial, infrastructure, mobile, automotive and aerospace markets.

The company supplies power integrated circuits including battery management, computing power, display power, regulators and controllers and power modules; as well as analog components such as amplifiers and buffers, proximity and light sensors, data converters, timing products, optoelectronics and interface products.

See also
 Intersil 6100
 RTX2010

References

External links

Companies based in Milpitas, California
Technology companies established in 1999
Semiconductor companies of the United States
Palm Bay, Florida
Superfund sites in California
2017 mergers and acquisitions
2000 initial public offerings
American subsidiaries of foreign companies
1999 establishments in California